Esther de Gélieu (20 September 1757 - 13 June 1817), was a Swiss educator. 

She managed a girls' school in Neuchâtel until she was employed as the first principal of the first girls' college in Germany (1782-1786), the Karolinen-Gymnasium in Frankenthal. In 1786, she was employed as governess at the court of the counts of Nassau-Weilburg. She later managed a school for girls in Basel, where she helped teach Isabelle Morel.

References 
 Hans Maisel: Geschichte des kurpfälzischen Philanthropins zu Frankenthal (1780–1799). Nach amtlichen Quellen bearbeitet nebst erziehungsgeschichtlicher Einleitung und Beiträgen zur Geschichte der Stadt Frankenthal. Christmann, Frankenthal 1889.

1757 births
1817 deaths
18th-century Swiss educators
Royal governesses
18th-century Swiss women